The discography page of Amy Macdonald, a Scottish rock/folk singer and songwriter from Bishopbriggs, East Dunbartonshire. Her debut album, This Is the Life was released in July 2007, peaking at number one on the UK Albums Chart. The album includes the singles "Poison Prince", "Mr Rock & Roll", "L.A.", "This Is the Life" and "Run". 

Her second album, A Curious Thing was released in March 2010, peaking at number four on the UK Albums Chart. The album includes the singles "Don't Tell Me That It's Over", "Spark", "This Pretty Face", "Love Love" and "Your Time Will Come". Her third album, Life in a Beautiful Light was released in June 2012, peaking at number two on the UK Albums Chart. The album includes the singles "Slow It Down", "Pride" and "4th of July". 

Her fourth album, Under Stars was released in February 2017, peaking at number two on the UK Albums Chart. The album includes the singles "Dream On", "Automatic" and "Down by the Water". Her fifth studio album, The Human Demands, was released in October 2020. The album includes the singles "The Hudson", "Crazy Shade of Blue" and "Fire".

Albums

Studio albums

Compilation albums

Live albums

Singles

As lead artist

As featured artist

Other appearances

Music videos

Notes

References

Folk music discographies
Discographies of British artists
Discography